The Death of Black King is a 1971 Czechoslovak film. The film starred Vlastimil Brodský, Jaroslav Marvan, Josef Vinklář, Josef Kemr, Stanislav Fišer, etc.

References

External links
 

1971 films
Czechoslovak mystery films
1970s Czech-language films
Czech detective films
1970s Czech films